Peter Alan Martin Clemoes (20 January 1920 – 16 March 1996) was a British historian.

Born in Southend-on-Sea and educated at Brentwood School, he originally wished to become an actor and won a scholarship to RADA but the Second World War intervened and he served with the Royal Corps of Signals. After the war he took a degree in English from Queen Mary College, London, which was followed by postgraduate work on Anglo-Saxon at King's College, Cambridge, gaining a PhD in 1956. He then held a research fellowship at the University of Reading until 1961 when he returned to Cambridge under Dorothy Whitelock, whom he replaced as Elrington and Bosworth Professor of Anglo-Saxon in the Department of Anglo-Saxon, Norse and Celtic in 1969.

His son Martin is the founder of Eye2eye Software Ltd, based in Cambridge, England.

Anglo-Saxon England
Clemoes was the editor of the journal Anglo-Saxon England, an annual survey of the literature on the subject, which also included a number of substantial papers.  The journal is a key publication in the field and is still published annually as of 2017.

External links 

1920 births
1996 deaths
Alumni of Queen Mary University of London
Alumni of King's College, Cambridge
Academics of the University of Reading
Elrington and Bosworth Professors of Anglo-Saxon
People from Southend-on-Sea
20th-century British historians
British Army personnel of World War II
Royal Corps of Signals soldiers
Military personnel from Southend-on-Sea